The Bazai is a Pashtun tribe settled in Pakistan and Afghanistan. The Bazai Tribe is the sub-cast of Kakar tribe living in the western and southern region of Quetta District, Pishin, Ziarat and Sibi districts of Balochistan. The tribe is mainly settled in the mountainous regions, including the Maslagh, Zarghoon, Takatoo mountains of Quetta. 

Gharghashti Pashtun tribes
Pashto-language surnames